Events from the year 1939 in Spain.

Incumbents
President: Manuel Azaña until March 3, Francisco Franco as leader
Prime Minister: Juan Negrín until April 1, Francisco Franco

Events
January 3 – The news agency EFE, based in Madrid, is officially founded as a limited company.
January 5-February 4: Battle of Valsequillo
January 26 - Catalonia Offensive: Nationalist forces capture Barcelona.
February 7–9 - Battle of Menorca (1939)
February 10 - Nationalists close Spanish border with France.
February 16 - the high command of the Republican army tells Negrín that further military resistance was impossible.
February 27 - United Kingdom and France recognized Francisco Franco's Nationalist government.
March 4–7 - Cartagena Uprising.
March 7 - Nationalist transport ship SS Castillo de Olite sunk by Republican shore batteries while entering the port of Cartagena.
March 5: coup of Segismundo Casado.
March 5: National Defence Council formed
March 26-April 1: Final offensive of the Spanish Civil War

Births

Deaths
March 15 - Luis Barceló (b. 1896)
November 15 - Etelvino Vega (b. 1906)

See also
List of Spanish films of the 1930s
Spanish Civil War

References

 
1930s in Spain
Years of the 20th century in Spain